Gun control, or firearms regulation, is the set of laws or policies that regulate the manufacture, sale, transfer, possession, modification, or use of firearms by civilians.

Most countries have a restrictive firearm guiding policy, with only a few being categorized as permissive. Jurisdictions that regulate access to firearms typically restrict access to only certain categories of firearms and then to restrict the categories of persons who will be granted a license to have access to a firearm. In some countries, such as the United States, gun control may be legislated at either a federal level or a local state level.

Terminology and context

Gun control refers to domestic regulation of firearm manufacture, trade, possession, use, and transport, specifically with regard to the class of weapons referred to as small arms (revolvers and self-loading pistols, rifles, and carbines, assault rifles, submachine guns, and light machine guns).

Usage of the term gun control is sometimes politicized. Some of those in favor of legislation instead prefer to use terms such as "gun-violence prevention", "gun safety", "firearms regulation", "illegal guns", or "criminal access to guns".

In 2007, it was estimated that globally there were about 875 million small arms in the hands of civilians, law enforcement agencies, and armed forces. Of these firearms 650 million, or 75%, are held by civilians. U.S. civilians account for 270 million of this total. A further 200 million are controlled by state military forces. Law enforcement agencies have some 26 million small arms. Non-state armed groups have about 1.4 million firearms. Finally, gang members hold between 2 and 10 million small arms. Together, the small arms arsenals of non-state armed groups and gangs account for, at most, 1.4% of the global total.

Regulation of civilian firearms
Barring a few exceptions, most countries in the world allow civilians to purchase firearms subject to certain restrictions. A 2011 survey of 28 countries over five continents found that a major distinction between different national regimes of firearm regulation is whether civilian gun ownership is seen as a right or a privilege. The study concluded that both the United States and Yemen were distinct from the other countries surveyed in viewing firearm ownership as a basic right of civilians and in having more permissive regimes of civilian gun ownership. In the remaining countries included in the sample, civilian firearm ownership is considered a privilege and the legislation governing possession of firearms is correspondingly more restrictive.

International and regional civilian firearm regulation

At the international and regional level, diplomatic attention has tended to focus on the cross-border illegal trade in small arms as an area of particular concern rather than the regulation of civilian-held firearms. During the mid-1990s, however, the United Nations Economic and Social Council (ECOSOC) adopted a series of resolutions relating to the civilian ownership of small arms. These called for an exchange of data on national systems of firearm regulation and for the initiation of an international study of the issue. In July 1997, ECOSOC issued a resolution that underlined the responsibility of UN member states to competently regulate civilian ownership of small arms and which urged them to ensure that their regulatory frameworks encompassed the following aspects: firearm safety and storage; penalties for the unlawful possession and misuse of firearms; a licensing system to prevent undesirable persons from owning firearms; exemption from criminal liability to promote the surrender by citizens of illegal, unsafe or unwanted guns; and, a record-keeping system to track civilian firearms.

In 1997, the UN published a study based on member state survey data titled the United Nations International Study on Firearm Regulation which was updated in 1999. This study was meant to initiate the establishment of a database on civilian firearm regulations which would be run by the Centre for International Crime Prevention, located in Vienna. who were to report on national systems of civilian firearm regulation every two years. These plans never reached fruition and further UN-led efforts to establish international norms for the regulation of civilian-held firearms were stymied. Responding to pressure from the U.S. government, any mention of the regulation of civilian ownership of small arms was removed from the draft proposals for the 2001 UN Programme of Action on Small Arms.

Although the issue is no longer part of the UN policy debate, since 1991 there have been eight regional agreements involving 110 countries concerning aspects of civilian firearm possession. The Bamako Declaration, was adopted in Bamako, Mali, on 1 December 2000 by the representatives of the member states of the Organisation of African Unity (OAU). The provisions of this declaration recommend that the signatories would establish the illegal possession of small arms and light weapons as a criminal offence under national law in their respective countries.

Studies

High rates of gun mortality and injury are often cited as a primary impetus for gun control policies. A 2004 National Research Council critical review found that while some strong conclusions are warranted from current research, the state of our knowledge is generally poor. The result of the scarcity of relevant data is that gun control is one of the most fraught topics in American politics, and scholars remain deadlocked on a variety of issues. Notably, since 1996, when the Dickey Amendment was first inserted into the federal spending bill, the Centers for Disease Control and Prevention (CDC) has been prohibited from using its federal funding "to advocate or promote gun control", thwarting gun violence research at the agency at the time. The funding provision's author has said that this was an over-interpretation, but the amendment still had a chilling effect, effectively halting federally funded firearm-related research. Since the amendment, the CDC has continued to research gun violence and publish studies about it, although their funding for such research has fallen by 96% since 1996, according to Mayors Against Illegal Guns. According to a spokesman, the CDC has limited funding and has not produced any comprehensive study aimed at reducing gun violence since 2001.

General
A 1998 review found that suicide rates generally declined after gun control laws were enacted, and concluded, "The findings support gun control measures as a strategy for reducing suicide rates." A 2016 review found that laws banning people under restraining orders due to domestic violence convictions from accessing guns were associated with "reductions in intimate partner homicide". Another 2016 review identified 130 studies regarding restrictive gun laws and found that the implementation of multiple such laws simultaneously was associated with a decrease in gun-related deaths. According to Vox, "The authors are careful to note that their findings do not conclusively prove that gun restrictions reduce gun deaths. However, they did find a compelling trend whereby new restrictions on gun purchasing and ownership tended to be followed by a decline in gun deaths."

According to a 2011 UN study, after identifying a number of methodological problems, it stated "notwithstanding such challenges, a significant body of literature tends to suggest that firearm availability predominantly represents a risk factor rather than a protective factor for homicide. In particular, a number of quantitative studies tend towards demonstrating a firearm prevalence–homicide association."

United States
Gun control activists argue that current gun policies are too permissive, while gun rights advocates argue that most gun policies are ineffective at reducing gun-related deaths.

Cross-sectional studies
In 1983, a cross-sectional study of all 50 U.S. states found that the six states with the strictest gun laws (according to the National Rifle Association) had suicide rates that were approximately 3/100,000 people lower than in other states, and that these states' suicide rates were 4/100,000 people lower than those of states with the least restrictive gun laws. A 2003 study published in the American Journal of Preventive Medicine looked at the restrictiveness of gun laws and suicide rates in men and women in all 50 U.S. states and found that states whose gun laws were more restrictive had lower suicide rates among both sexes. In 2004, another study found that the effect of state gun laws on gun-related homicides was "limited". A 2005 study looked at all 50 states in the U.S. and the District of Columbia, and found that no gun laws were associated with reductions in firearm homicide or suicide, but that a "shall-issue" concealed carry law (mandatory issue of a license when legal criteria met) may be associated with increased firearm homicide rates. A 2011 study found that firearm regulation laws in the United States have "a significant deterrent effect on male suicide".

A 2013 study found that in the United States, "A higher number of firearm laws in a state are associated with a lower rate of firearm fatalities in the state." A 2016 study published in The Lancet found that of 25 laws studied, and in the time period examined (2008–2010), nine were associated with reduced firearm mortality (including both homicide and suicide), nine were associated with increased mortality, and seven had an inconclusive association. The three laws most strongly associated with reduced firearm mortality were laws requiring universal background checks, background checks for ammunition sales, and identification for guns. In an accompanying commentary, David Hemenway noted that this study had multiple limitations, such as not controlling for all factors that may influence gun-related deaths aside from gun control laws, and the use of 29 explanatory variables in the analysis.

Other studies comparing gun control laws in different U.S. states include a 2015 study which found that in the United States, "stricter state firearm legislation is associated with lower discharge rates" for nonfatal gun injuries. A 2014 study that also looked at the United States found that children living in states with stricter gun laws were safer. Another study looking specifically at suicide rates in the United States found that the four handgun laws examined (waiting periods, universal background checks, gun locks, and open carrying regulations) were associated with "significantly lower firearm suicide rates and the proportion of suicides resulting from firearms." The study also found that all four of these laws (except the waiting-period one) were associated with reductions in the overall suicide rate.

Another study, published the same year, found that states with permit to purchase, registration, and/or license laws for handguns had lower overall suicide rates, as well as lower firearm suicide rates. A 2014 study found that states that required licensing and inspections of gun dealers tended to have lower rates of gun homicides. Another study published the same year, analyzing panel data from all 50 states, found that stricter gun laws may modestly reduce gun deaths. A 2016 study found that U.S. military veterans tend to commit suicide with guns more often than the general population, thereby possibly increasing state suicide rates, and that "the tendency for veterans to live in states without handgun legislation may exacerbate this phenomenon." California has exceptionally strict gun sales laws, and a 2015 study found that it also had the oldest guns recovered in crimes of any states in the U.S. The same study concluded that "These findings suggest that more restrictive gun sales laws and gun dealer regulations do make it more difficult for criminals to acquire new guns first purchased at retail outlets."

Another 2016 study found that stricter state gun laws in the United States reduced suicide rates. Another 2016 study found that U.S. states with lenient gun control laws had more gun-related child injury hospital admissions than did states with stricter gun control laws. A 2017 study found that suicide rates declined more in states with universal background check and mandatory waiting period laws than in states without these laws. Another 2017 study found that states without universal background check and/or waiting period laws had steeper increases in their suicide rates than did states with these laws. A third 2017 study found that "waiting period laws that delay the purchase of firearms by a few days reduce gun homicides by roughly 17%." A 2017 study in the Economic Journal found that mandatory handgun purchase delays reduced "firearm related suicides by between 2 to 5 percent with no statistically significant increase in non-firearm suicides," and were "not associated with statistically significant changes in homicide rates." Another 2017 study showed that laws banning gun possession by people subject to intimate partner violence restraining orders, and requiring such people to give up any guns they have, were associated with lower intimate partner homicide rates. A 2021 study found that firearm purchase delay laws reduced homicide – the authors suggested that it was driven by reductions in gun purchases by impulsive customers.

Reviews

In 2015, Daniel Webster and Garen Wintemute reviewed studies examining the effectiveness of gun laws aimed at keeping guns out of the hands of high-risk individuals in the United States. They found that some laws prohibiting gun possession by people under domestic violence restraining orders or who had been convicted of violent misdemeanors were associated with lower violence rates, as were laws establishing more procedures to see if people were prohibited from owning a gun under these laws. They also found that multiple other gun regulations intended to prevent prohibited individuals from obtaining guns, such as "rigorous permit-to-purchase" laws and "comprehensive background checks", were "negatively associated with the diversion of guns to criminals."

A 2016 systematic review found that restrictive gun licensing laws were associated with lower gun injury rates, while concealed carry laws were not significantly associated with rates of such injuries. Another systematic review found that stricter gun laws were associated with lower gun homicide rates; this association was especially strong for background check and permit-to-purchase laws.

A 2020 review of almost 13,000 studies by RAND Corporation found only 123 that met their criteria of methodological rigor, "a surprisingly limited base of rigorous scientific evidence...". Only 2 of the 18 gun policies examined had supporting evidence. Among the policies for which RAND found supporting evidence were that child-access prevention laws reduce firearm injuries and deaths among children and that "stand-your-ground" laws increase firearm homicides. RAND also noted that the limited evidence currently available "does not mean that these policies are ineffective ... Instead, it partly reflects shortcomings in the contributions that science has made to policy debates."

Studies of individual laws
Other studies have examined trends in firearm-related deaths before and after gun control laws are either enacted or repealed. A 2004 study in the Journal of the American Medical Association found evidence that child access prevention laws were "associated with a modest reduction in suicide rates among youth aged 14 to 17 years." Two 2015 studies found that the permit-to-purchase law passed in Connecticut in 1995 was associated with a reduction in firearm suicides and homicides. One of these studies also found that the repeal of Missouri's permit-to-purchase law was associated with "a 16.1% increase in firearm suicide rates," and a 2014 study by the same research team found that the repeal of this law was associated with a 16% increase in homicide rates. A 2000 study designed to assess the effectiveness of the Brady Handgun Violence Prevention Act found that the law was not associated with reductions in overall homicide or suicide rates, but that it was associated with a reduction in the firearm suicide rate among individuals aged 55 or older. A 1991 study looked at Washington, D.C.'s Firearms Control Regulations Act of 1975, which banned its residents from owning all guns except certain shotguns and sporting rifles, which were also required to be unloaded, disassembled, or stored with a trigger lock in their owners' homes. The study found that the law's enactment was associated with "a prompt decline in homicides and suicides by firearms in the District of Columbia." A 1996 study reanalyzed this data and reached a significantly different conclusion as to the effectiveness of this law.

Other studies and debate
In 1993, Kleck and Patterson analyzed the impact of 18 major types of gun control laws on every major type of gun-involved crime or violence (including suicide) in 170 U.S. cities, and found that gun laws generally had no significant effect on violent crime rates or suicide rates. Similarly, a 1997 study found that gun control laws had only a small influence on the rate of gun deaths in U.S. states compared to socioeconomic variables like poverty and unemployment.

Philosophy professor Michael Huemer argues that gun control may be morally wrong, even if its outcomes would be positive, because individuals have a prima facie right to own a gun for self-defense and recreation.

RAND Corporation did a study that demonstrates that background checks may decrease suicides and violent crime; child-access prevention laws may decrease the number of suicides and unintentional injuries and deaths; minimum age requirements may decrease suicides; and prohibitions associated with mental illness may decrease suicides and violent crimes. On the other hand, concealed-carry laws may increase violent crimes and suicides, while stand-your-ground laws may increase violent crime. Bans on the sale of assault weapons and high-capacity magazines may increase the sale price for these items. An August 2019 article entitled, "Gun control really works" published by Business Insider looks at a dozen studies by the Centers for Disease Control and Prevention, The Journal of the American Medical Association, Rand Corporation, the journal Preventive Medicine, Everytown for Gun Safety, Johns Hopkins University, and others. They conclude that mirroring the firearms regulations in Switzerland such as banning the sale of new assault weapons, denying concealed-carry licenses to some individuals, and prohibiting firearm sales to people convicted of multiple alcohol-related offenses will decrease gun-related deaths and injuries.

Canada

Rifles and shotguns are relatively easy to obtain, while handguns and some semi-automatic rifles are restricted.

With respect to the Criminal Law Amendment Act, a gun control law passed in Canada in 1977, some studies have found that it was ineffective at reducing homicide or robbery rates. One study even found that the law may have actually increased robberies involving firearms. A 1993 study found that after this law was passed, gun suicides decreased significantly, as did the proportion of suicides committed in the country with guns. A 2003 study found that this law "may have had an impact on suicide rates, even after controls for social variables," while a 2001 study by the same research team concluded that the law "may have had an impact on homicide rates, at least for older victims." A 1994 study found that after this law came into force in 1978, suicide rates decreased over time in Ontario, and that there was no evidence of method substitution. The same study found that "These decreases may be only partly due to the legislation."

In 1991, Canada implemented the gun control law Bill C-17. According to a 2004 study, after this law was passed, firearm-related suicides and homicides, as well as the percentage of suicides involving firearms, declined significantly in that country. A 2010 study found that after this law was passed, firearm suicides declined in Quebec among men, but acknowledged that this may not represent a causal relationship. In 1992, Canada promulgated the Canadian Firearms Act, which aimed at ensuring that guns were stored safely. A 2004 study found that although firearm suicide rates declined in the Quebec region Abitibi-Témiscamingue after the law was passed, overall suicide rates did not. A study in 2005 also found that overall suicide rates did not change after passage of Bill C-17. A 2008 study reached similar conclusions with regard to the entire Quebec province; this study also found that C-17 did not seem to increase the rate at which the firearm suicide rate was declining. Other researchers have criticized this 2008 study for looking at too short a time period and not taking account of the fact that the regulations in C-17 were implemented gradually.

A 1990 study compared suicide rates in the Vancouver, British Columbia, Canada metropolitan area (where gun control laws were more restrictive) with those in the Seattle, Washington area in the United States. The overall suicide rate was essentially the same in the two locations, but the suicide rate among 15 to 24 year olds was about 40 percent higher in Seattle than in Vancouver. The authors concluded that "restricting access to handguns might be expected to reduce the suicide rate in persons 15 to 24 years old, but ... it probably would not reduce the overall suicide rate." A study that looked at provincial gun ownership rates, and associated suicide rates found no significant correlations with overall suicide rates.

A 2011 study looked at gun control passed in Canada between 1974 and 2004 and found that gun laws were responsible for 5 to 10 percent drops in homicides. The study found that the homicide reduction effects of Canadian gun legislation remained even after accounting for sociodemographic and economic factors associated with homicide rates.

A 2012 study looked at gun control laws passed in Canada from 1974 to 2008 and found no evidence that these laws had a beneficial effect on firearm homicide rates in that country. According to the study, "other factors found to be associated with homicide rates were median age, unemployment, immigration rates, percentage of population in low-income bracket, Gini index of income equality, population per police officer, and incarceration rate."

A 2013 study of the 1995 Canadian gun control law Firearms Act, 1995 reported little evidence that this law significantly reduced rates of lethal gun violence against women.

On May 1, 2020, after deadly shootings in Nova Scotia, Justin Trudeau's Liberal government banned 1,500 kinds of military-style semi-automatic rifles, including the popular AR-15 and its variants. The ban was enacted via an Order In Council.

A 2020 study examining laws passed from 1981-2016 found no significant changes in overall homicide or suicide rates following changes in legislation. In addition, it also found that firearm ownership by province was not correlated to overall suicide rates by province.

Australia

In 1988 and 1996, gun control laws were enacted in the Australian state of Victoria, both times following mass shootings. A 2004 study found that in the context of these laws, overall firearm-related deaths, especially suicides, declined dramatically. A 1995 study found preliminary evidence that gun control legislation enacted in Queensland, Australia, reduced suicide rates there.

A 2006 study by gun lobby-affiliated researchers Jeanine Baker and Samara McPhedran found that after Australia enacted the National Firearms Agreement (NFA), a gun control law, in 1996, gun-related suicides may have been affected, but no other parameter appeared to have been. Another 2006 study, led by Simon Chapman, found that after this law was enacted in 1996 in Australia, the country went more than a decade without any mass shootings, and gun-related deaths (especially suicides) declined dramatically. The latter of these studies also criticized the former for using a time-series analysis despite the fact that, according to Chapman et al., "calculating mortality rates and then treating them as a number in a time series ignores the natural variability inherent in the counts that make up the numerator of the rate." Chapman et al. also said that Baker and McPhedran used the Box–Jenkins model inappropriately.

A 2010 study looking at the effect of the NFA on gun-related deaths found that the law "did not have any large effects on reducing firearm homicide or suicide rates," although David Hemenway has criticized this study for using a structural break test despite the fact that such tests can miss the effects of policies in the presence of lags, or when the effect occurs over several years. Another study, published the same year, found that Australia's gun buyback program reduced gun-related suicide rates by almost 80%, while non-gun death rates were not significantly affected. Other research has argued that although gun suicide rates fell after the NFA was enacted, the NFA may not have been responsible for this decrease and "a change in social and cultural attitudes" may have instead been at least partly responsible. A 2011 study found that "Australia's prohibition of certain types of firearms" has not prevented mass shootings. In 2016, Chapman co-authored another study that found that after the NFA was passed, there were no mass shootings in the country, and that gun-related death rates declined more quickly after the NFA than they did before it. The study also found, however, that non-gun suicide and homicide rates declined even more quickly after the NFA, leading the authors to conclude that "it is not possible to determine whether the change in firearm deaths can be attributed to the gun law reforms."

Other countries

A 2007 study found evidence that gun control laws passed in Austria in 1997 reduced the rates of firearm suicide and homicide in that country. In Brazil, after disarmament laws were passed in 2003, gun-related mortality declined by 8% in 2004 relative to the previous year, the first decline observed in a decade. Gun-related hospitalizations also reversed their previous trend by decreasing 4.6% from 2003 to 2004. A 2006 study found that after gun control laws were passed in New Zealand in 1992, suicides committed with guns declined significantly, especially among youth. This study however found that overall suicide rates did not change significantly. A case-control study conducted in New Zealand found that gun ownership was significantly associated with a greater risk of gun suicides, but not suicides overall.

A 2010 study looked at the effect of a policy adopted by the Israeli Defense Forces that restricted access to guns among adolescents on suicide rates, and found that "Following the policy change, suicide rates decreased significantly by 40%." The authors concluded that "The results of this study illustrate the ability of a relatively simple change in policy to have a major impact on suicide rates." A 2013 study showed that after the Military of Switzerland adopted the Army XXI reform, which restricted gun availability, in 2003, suicide ratesboth overall and firearm-relateddecreased. Another 2013 study looking at four restrictive gun laws passed in Norway found that two of them may have reduced firearm mortality among men, but that the evidence was more inconclusive with respect to all of the laws they studied. A 2014 study found that after South Africa's Firearm Control Act was passed in 2000, homicide rates in the country declined, and concluded that "stricter gun control mediated by the FCA accounted for a significant decrease in homicide overall, and firearm homicide in particular, during the study period [2001–2005]." A 2000 study found that a ban on carrying guns in Colombia was associated with reductions in homicide rates in two cities in the country, namely, Cali and Bogotá.

See also
 Concealed carry
 Gun violence
 List of most-produced firearms
 Right to keep and bear arms

International
 Game law
 Hunting license
 List of countries by gun ownership
 Overview of gun laws by nation

United States
 Assault weapons legislation in the United States
 Federal Assault Weapons Ban
 Gun Control Act of 1968
 Gun control after the Sandy Hook Elementary School shooting
 Gun politics in the United States
 Gun show loophole
 Public opinion on gun control in the United States
 2018 United States gun violence protests

Notes

References

Bibliography

Further reading
 Rakoff, Jed S., "The Last of His Kind" (review of John Paul Stevens, The Making of a Justice: Reflections on My First 94 Years, Little, Brown, 549 pp.), The New York Review of Books, vol. LXVI, no. 14 (26 September 2019), pp. 20, 22, 24. John Paul Stevens, "a throwback to the postwar liberal Republican [U.S. Supreme Court] appointees", questioned the validity of "the doctrine of sovereign immunity, which holds that you cannot sue any state or federal government agency, or any of its officers or employees, for any wrong they may have committed against you, unless the state or federal government consents to being sued" (p. 20); the propriety of "the increasing resistance of the U.S. Supreme Court to most meaningful forms of gun control" (p. 22); and "the constitutionality of the death penalty... because of incontrovertible evidence that innocent people have been sentenced to death." (pp. 22, 24.)

External links

 
 GunPolicy.org

National groups
 Gun Control Australia – Supporting Gun Control in Australia
 Coalition for Gun Control – Canada
 Stop Gun Caravan – Japan
 Gun Free South Africa
 Coalition to Stop Gun Violence – U.S.
 Brady Campaign to Prevent Gun Violence – U.S.
 Giffords – U.S.

Firearms
Gun politics
Prohibitionism